Pseudochelatococcus is a genus of bacteria from the family of Beijerinckiaceae.

References

Further reading 
 

Beijerinckiaceae
Bacteria genera